Vytautas Magnus University Botanical Garden also known as the Kaunas Botanical Garden, is a university botanical garden located in the south of the center of Kaunas city, Freda district, Ž.E.Žilibero str. 6. With an area of  it is the second largest in Lithuania. This institution is a member of BGCI, with international identification code KAUN.

About Garden

Botanical Garden was founded in 1923 as the centre of botanical sciences that belonged to Lithuanian (later Vytautas Magnus) University. Spacious green area with the old park, picturesque ponds and several buildings of the former estate of Juozapas Godlevskis (Aukstosios Fredos estate) was provided for establishing botanical garden at that time. Professor Constantin Regel from Tartu University was invited to direct Kaunas Botanical Garden. The detailed project for the garden landscape was made in 1924 by architect Karol Rauth from Hanover. With the help of other botanical gardens, especially Berlin's Dahlem, Königsberg and St. Petersburg's Kaunas Botanical Garden built up very rapidly. The construction of the Greenhouse was finished in 1938.

Presently, Vytautas Magnus University Botanical Garden occupies the area of 62.5 ha close to the city center. It is multifunctional university botanical garden that consists of three departments: Science, Expositions and Collections, and Service and Education. The Science department is divided into three sectors: Medicinal and Spice Plants, Dendrology and Phytopathology, and Pomology. Department of Expositions and Collections includes sectors of Plant systematics, Floriculture and Greenhouse.

The unique feature of this garden is peaceful and green environment created by an advantageous combination of cultural and natural heritage. Botanical expositions and collections, the Greenhouse, big landscape park with an interesting pond system – this is not only place for plant conservation and research but also area for all modern forms of interactive education, cultural tourism and community use. Kaunas Botanical Garden accepts more than 90 thousands visitors per year.

Vytautas Magnus University Botanical Garden is a member of the Lithuanian Association of University Botanical Gardens (LAUBG), the Association of Baltic Botanic Gardens (ABBG), the Botanic Garden Conservation International (BGCI) and the Network of Botanic Gardens in the Baltic Sea region.

Directors

Collections
Accession Number: 14783

Special Collections: Rosa – 1577, Dahlia – 1481, Tulipa – 457, Hemerocallis - 452, Paeonia - 306, Rhododendron - 251, Hosta - 241, Lilium - 228, Astilbe - 194, Aster - 134 collection numbers.

Gallery

References

External links

Official website
Vytautas Magnus University Botanical Garden in Kaunas on BGCI

Botanical gardens in Lithuania
Buildings and structures in Kaunas
Research institutes in Lithuania
Research institutes in the Soviet Union
Botanical research institutes
1923 establishments in Lithuania
Tourist attractions in Kaunas